Mario Melvin Soto (born July 12, 1956) is a Dominican former pitcher, mostly as a starter, for the Cincinnati Reds of Major League Baseball (MLB) from  through . He currently works in the Reds' front office.

Career
For most of his career, the Dominican right-hander was essentially a two-pitch pitcher. He possessed a hard fastball (clocked in the low-to-mid 90s) and complemented it with a baffling circle changeup, both thrown from the three-quarters position. Soto's changeup was particularly effective against left-handed hitters. On occasion, Soto would also throw a slider, which he turned to more in the latter stage of his career. He less frequently threw a curveball.

On May 12, Soto came very close to throwing a no-hitter against the St. Louis Cardinals. However, with two out in the top of the ninth inning and the Reds up 1–0, outfielder George Hendrick spoiled the no-hitter with a game-tying solo home run. The Reds won the game for Soto in the bottom of the ninth, 2–1.

In , Soto finished second in voting for the National League's Cy Young Award. Philadelphia's John Denny was the winner. Statistically, 1983 and 1984 were Soto's best seasons. He compiled a 35–20 record with a 2.92 earned run average and he established himself as the ace of the Cincinnati Reds' rotation. However, the Reds finished with losing records in both seasons.

In a 12-season career, all for Cincinnati, he was 100–92 with a 3.47 ERA in 297 games, 224 of them starts. He had 72 career complete games and 13 shutouts. He allowed 1,395 hits, 667 earned runs, 657 bases on balls and struck out 1,449 batters in 1,730 innings pitched. He also earned four saves (all during the 1980 season).

By 1986, Soto's performance had rapidly deteriorated due to shoulder injury. On April 29, 1986, against the Montreal Expos, Soto became the 11th pitcher in major league history to surrender four home runs in an inning.

Controversy
On May 27, 1984, against the Chicago Cubs at Wrigley Field, third baseman Ron Cey hit what was originally ruled a home run down the left field line. Believing the ball had gone foul, Soto and Reds manager Vern Rapp disputed the call, and during the argument, Soto shoved third-base umpire Steve Rippley, who had made the call. After conferring, the umpires changed their decision and ruled it a foul ball, drawing a protest from the Cubs. However, for shoving Rippley, Soto was ejected, prompting him to charge the field. Cubs coach Don Zimmer stepped in front of Rippley to prevent Soto from attacking the umpire, only to himself be tackled by Soto and (inadvertently) catcher Brad Gulden, which triggered a 10-minute brawl. Four days later, National League president Chub Feeney suspended Mario Soto for five games.

In the second incident, on June 16, the Reds were playing the Atlanta Braves in Atlanta. Braves player Claudell Washington homered in the first inning off Soto. During Washington's second at-bat, Soto threw near Washington's chin and sent him to the ground, but Washington only stared at Soto. On Soto's first pitch of Washington's third at bat, Washington swung and let go of his bat in the direction of first base and walked toward the mound. Umpire Lanny Harris attempted to intervene, but Washington threw Harris to the ground as he lunged toward Soto. Soto punched Washington with the baseball in his hand, and both benches cleared. Reds catcher Dann Bilardello wrestled Washington to the ground and Soto threw the ball at Washington, but he struck Braves coach Joe Pignatano's shin instead. Soto was suspended five games and $5,000, and Washington received a three-game suspension and a $1,000 fine.

Later Years
In 2001, Soto was inducted into the Cincinnati Reds Hall of Fame and Museum. He has also worked with the team as a pitching coach, helping several Reds pitchers develop a change-up. He currently works in the Reds' front office. Soto is credited as the person who taught Edinson Vólquez and Johnny Cueto their change-ups, which have been go-to strikeout pitches in their careers.

See also
 List of Major League Baseball single-inning strikeout leaders
 List of Major League Baseball players who spent their entire career with one franchise

References

External links

Sports Illustrated

1956 births
Living people
Bakersfield Dodgers players
Cincinnati Reds players
Dominican Republic baseball coaches
Dominican Republic expatriate baseball players in the United States
Eugene Emeralds players
Gulf Coast Reds players
Indianapolis Indians players
Dominican Republic national baseball team people

Major League Baseball pitchers
Major League Baseball players from the Dominican Republic
Nashville Sounds players
National League All-Stars
People from Baní
Tampa Tarpons (1957–1987) players